Trask Pond is a small lake southwest of Rock Rift in Delaware County, New York. It drains south via an unnamed creek that flows into Read Creek, which flows into the East Branch Delaware River. Merrick Pond is located west and Rock Rift Mountain is located east of Trask Pond.

See also
 List of lakes in New York

References 

Lakes of New York (state)
Lakes of Delaware County, New York